Robert Anthony Snow (June 1, 1955 – July 12, 2008) was an American journalist, political commentator, anchor, columnist, musician, and the 25th White House Press Secretary under President George W. Bush, from May 2006 until his resignation in September 2007. Snow also worked for the President George H. W. Bush as chief speechwriter and Deputy Assistant of Media Affairs, from 1991 to 1993.
Between his two White House stints, Snow was a broadcaster and newspaper columnist. After years of regular guest-hosting for The Rush Limbaugh Show and providing news commentary for National Public Radio, he launched his own talk radio program, The Tony Snow Show, which went on to become nationally syndicated. He was also a regular personality on Fox News Channel beginning in 1996, hosting Fox News Sunday and Weekend Live, and often substituting as host of The O'Reilly Factor. In April 2008, Snow briefly joined CNN as a commentator.  He also made several notable speeches, including keynote addresses at the Conservative Political Action Conference in 2007 and 2008.
In his journalistic and governmental capacities, Snow generally supported conservative causes.

Early life and education 
Snow was born in Berea, Kentucky, and raised in Cincinnati, Ohio. His father, Jim, was a social studies teacher, guidance counselor, and an assistant principal at Princeton High School. His mother was an inner-city nurse who died of colon cancer in 1973, when Snow was 17. Snow developed an early interest in journalism, public policy, and politics, and was editor of his high school newspaper.

After graduating from Princeton High School in 1973, Snow obtained in 1977 a Bachelor of Arts in philosophy from Davidson College in North Carolina. He then taught physics in high school. He attended graduate programs in philosophy and economics at the University of Chicago.

In Ohio, Snow originally registered to vote as a Democrat. He was a convert to Roman Catholicism.

Career

Journalism and broadcasting 

Snow began his journalism career in 1979 as an editorial writer for The Greensboro Record in Greensboro, North Carolina, next working as an editorial writer at The Virginian-Pilot in Norfolk, Virginia (1981–82), editorial page editor of The Daily Press in Newport News (1982–84), deputy editorial page editor of The Detroit News (1984–87), and editorial page editor of The Washington Times (1987–91). 

In 1991, Snow took a sabbatical from journalism to work in the White House for President George H. W. Bush, first as chief speechwriter (Deputy Assistant to the President for Communications and Director of Speechwriting) and later as Deputy Assistant to the President for Media Affairs (1992–1993).

From 1993 to 2000, The Detroit News published his commentaries, and from 1994 to 2000 he was a Counterpoint Columnist for USA Today. Snow also wrote a syndicated column for Creators Syndicate between 1993 and 2000; his commentaries appeared in more than 200 newspapers nationwide. Snow won numerous awards during his print career, including those from the Virginia Press Association, the Detroit Press Club, the Society of Professional Journalists, the American Society of Newspaper Editors, The Associated Press, and Gannett.

Snow appeared on radio and television programs worldwide including The McLaughlin Group, The MacNeil–Lehrer NewsHour, Face the Nation, Crossfire, and Good Morning America. Until 1994, Snow was the writer, correspondent and host of the PBS news special The New Militant Center.

From 1996 to 2003, Snow was the first host of FOX News Sunday, a Sunday morning interview and roundtable program produced by Fox News, airing on affiliates of the Fox Broadcasting Company and later in the day on Fox News Channel.

Snow was the primary guest host of Rush Limbaugh's program beginning in the mid-1990s. He was also a frequent commentator on National Public Radio. Snow's own Tony Snow Show on Fox News Radio premiered in late 2003. It ended when he became White House Press Secretary in April 2006.

White House Press Secretary 
In April 2006, Snow was named White House Press Secretary in the George W. Bush administration, replacing Scott McClellan. His appointment to the position was formally announced on April 26, 2006. His selection was initially criticized because of some of his past comments about Bush. Bush acknowledged Snow's criticisms during the announcement of Snow's appointment, saying that Snow was "not afraid to express his own opinions".

Snow began his new press secretary duties on May 8, 2006. He decided to leave the position of press secretary after new White House Chief of Staff Josh Bolten asked all staff members to either commit to staying through the end of Bush's second term, in January 2009, or to leave by Labor Day of 2007. On September 13, 2007, Snow gave his final press briefing, saying that he would miss the duties of his position, and that "I love these briefings".

Personal life
Snow was an avid musician. He played the trombone, flute, piccolo, saxophone, and guitar, and belonged to a cover band, Beats Workin', which featured fellow Washington-area professionals. Beats Workin' played publicly with a number of rock bands, including Snow's friends Skunk Baxter (The Doobie Brothers, Steely Dan) and Ian Anderson of Jethro Tull. Snow was featured on an episode of VH1 Classic's Rock 'n Roll Fantasy Camp.

Illness and death 
In February 2005, while still at Fox News, Snow was diagnosed with colon cancer.  He returned to broadcasting in April 2005 after undergoing surgery.  On March 23, 2007, after almost a year as press secretary, Snow once again took a leave of absence to seek treatment for recurrent cancer. Treatment for the spreading cancer in his final few months forced periodic absences from Snow's duties as press secretary, his subsequent position as a CNN commentator, and his public speaking engagements.

On July 12, 2008, Snow died at Georgetown University Hospital as a result of colon cancer that had spread to his liver. He was 53 years old. Reacting to Snow's death, President George W. Bush praised Snow's ability to bring "a certain civility to this very contentious job."

References

External links

President Announces Tony Snow as Press Secretary, White House news release
Tony Snow 1995 lecture, the John M. Ashbrook Center for Public Affairs at Ashland University

Cancer's Unexpected Blessing by Tony Snow at Christianity Today

C-SPAN Q&A interview with Snow, August 12, 2007

|-

1955 births
2008 deaths
20th-century American journalists
21st-century American journalists
American columnists
American male journalists
American television journalists
Catholics from Kentucky
Converts to Roman Catholicism
Davidson College alumni
Deaths from cancer in Washington, D.C.
Deaths from colorectal cancer
Fox News people
George W. Bush administration personnel
Journalists from Ohio
Ohio Republicans
People from Berea, Kentucky
Television personalities from Cincinnati
The Washington Times people
Virginia Republicans
White House Directors of Speechwriting
White House Press Secretaries